Garmann is a surname. Notable people with the surname include:

Herman Garmann (1787–1853), Norwegian businessman and merchant
Kari Garmann (born 1945), Norwegian politician

See also
Garman
Gartmann